The year 2006 is the 12th year in the history of Fighting Network Rings, a mixed martial arts promotion based in Japan. In 2006 Fighting Network Rings held 3 events beginning with, Rings: Road to Japan.

Events list

Rings: Road to Japan

Rings: Road to Japan was an event held on March 26, 2006 in Holland.

Results

Rings Lithuania: Lekeciai 500

Rings Lithuania: Lekeciai 500 was an event held on August 13, 2006 in Lekeciai, Marijampole County, Lithuania.

Results

Rings: Holland

Rings: Holland was an event held on November 19, 2006 in Enschede, Holland.

Results

See also 
 List of Fighting Network Rings events

References

Fighting Network Rings events
2006 in mixed martial arts